The Pacific bumper (Chloroscombrus orqueta) is one of two game fish in the genus Chloroscombrus, from the subfamily Caranginae of the family Carangidae, part of the order Carangiformes.

It is listed by the IUCN as Least Concern. This species ranges from southern California to the Gulf of California to central Peru. It is also found around Malpelo Island.

References

Pacific bumper
Fish of the Gulf of California
Fish of Mexican Pacific coast
Western Central American coastal fauna
Pacific bumper